Saint-Pierre-Montlimart is a former commune in the Maine-et-Loire department in western France.

Geography
The commune is traversed by the Èvre river.

History 
On 15 December 2015, La Boissière-sur-Èvre, Chaudron-en-Mauges, La Chaussaire, Le Fief-Sauvin, Le Fuilet, Montrevault, Le Puiset-Doré, Saint-Pierre-Montlimart, Saint-Quentin-en-Mauges, Saint-Rémy-en-Mauges and La Salle-et-Chapelle-Aubry merged becoming one commune called Montrevault-sur-Èvre.

See also
Communes of the Maine-et-Loire department

References

Saintpierremontlimart